Alpnachstad PB railway station is a railway station in the municipality of Alpnach, in the Swiss canton of Obwalden. It is the base station of the Pilatus Railway rack railway that ascends near the summit of Pilatus. The station is located across the street from the  station of Zentralbahn on the Brünig line.

Services 
The following services stop at Alpnachstad PB:

References

External links 
 
 Official site

Railway stations in the canton of Obwalden
Cultural property of national significance in Obwalden